Debtor is an American Christian hardcore band, and they primarily play hardcore punk and melodic hardcore. They come from Philadelphia, Pennsylvania. The band started making music in 2007. The band released an extended play, Deliverance, in 2009, with Blood and Ink Records. Their first studio album, Bloodseeds, was released by Blood and Ink Records, in 2011.

Background
Debtor is a Christian hardcore band from Philadelphia, Pennsylvania. They count as their members Alan Popoli, Scott Rudy, Joe Motson, Josh Galloway, and Jason Warner.

Music history
The band commenced as a musical entity in September 2007, with their first release, Deliverance, an extended play, that was released on December 9, 2009, from Blood and Ink Records. Their subsequent release, a studio album, Bloodseeds, was released by Blood and Ink Records on July 9, 2011.

Members
Current members
 Alan Popoli - Vocals
 Scott Rudy - Bass
 Joe Motson - Guitar
 Josh Galloway - Drums
 Jason Warner - Guitar

Discography
Studio albums
 Bloodseeds (July 9, 2011, Blood and Ink)
EPs
 Deliverance (December 9, 2009, Blood and Ink)

References

External links
 Facebook page

Musical groups from Philadelphia
2007 establishments in Pennsylvania
Musical groups established in 2007
Blood and Ink Records artists